Manolo Herrero may refer to:
Manolo Herrero (footballer, born 1970), Spanish football manager and former midfielder
Manolo Herrero (footballer, born 1967), Spanish football manager and former midfielder